Houtermans may refer to

 Fritz Houtermans (1903–1966),  Dutch-Austrian-German physicist 
 Houtermans (crater), lunar crater
 Houtermans Award, award of the European Association of Geochemistry